Helpline may refer to:

 Helpline (film), a 2004 short film
 "Helpline" (song), a 2017 song by Mura Masa from the eponymous album Mura Masa
 Helpline Telecoms Nigeria Limited (aka "Helpline"), a Nigerian company offering online virtual e-vouchers and e-cards
 116 helplines in Europe

See also

 Emergency telephone number
 List of emergency telephone numbers
 List of suicide helplines
 
 
 Hotline (disambiguation)
 Help (disambiguation)
 Line (disambiguation)